Bivarzin (also Romanized as Bīvarzīn; also known as Bevarzan and Bīvarzan) is a village in Jirandeh Rural District, Amarlu District, Rudbar County, Gilan Province, Iran. At the 2006 census, its population was 88, in 29 families.

References 

Populated places in Rudbar County